Australia is home to four professional football codes. This is a comprehensive list of crowd figures for Australian football codes in 2013. It includes several different competitions and matches from association football, Australian rules football, rugby league and rugby union (international rules football is a code of football played by Australian rules footballers). Sydney, Melbourne and Brisbane have teams represented in all four codes. Hobart and Darwin are Australia's only capital cities without a professional football team.

Included competitions

National competitions
Several football codes have national (domestic) competitions in Australia, the following are taken into consideration:

The 2013–14 A-League season (A-L)
 2013–14 A-League season
 2013–14 A-League final series
The 2013 Australian Football League season (AFL)
 2013 NAB Cup
 2013 AFL premiership season
 2013 AFL finals series
The 2013 National Rugby League season (NRL)
 2013 NRL premiership season
 2013 NRL finals series
The 2013 Super Rugby season (SR)
 2013 Super Rugby season
 2013 Super Rugby finals series

Two of these leagues, specifically the NRL and A-League, have one club each in New Zealand, while only five of the fifteen Super Rugby franchises are located in Australia, with the other ten split evenly between New Zealand and South Africa. Attendance figures for non-Australian clubs are not taken into account in the figures on this page.

In addition, one St Kilda AFL match held in Wellington is also not included.

Other competitions
Other competitions, such as international and representative competitions, included are:

The 2013 AFC Champions League (ACL)
The 2013 State of Origin series (SoO)
The 2013 Rugby Championship (RU Champ)
The 2013 British & Irish Lions tour to Australia (B&I Tour)

Note: For these competitions, only figures for games that take place in Australia are taken into account.

No Rugby League Four Nations competition is scheduled for 2013, England and Wales will host in October the 2013 Rugby League World Cup.

Non-competition games
Some non-competition matches (such as friendly and exhibition matches) are also included:

Home test matches played by the Australian National Rugby League Team, the Kangaroos, in 2013.
Home matches played by the Australian National Association Football Team, the Socceroos, in 2013.
Home test matches played by the Australian National Rugby Union Team, the Wallabies, in 2013.
NRL All Stars match, in 2013.
City vs Country Origin match, in 2013.
E. J. Whitten Legends Game, celebrity and former player Australian Rules charity exhibition match

Attendances by Code
In order to directly compare sports, the total attendances for each major code are listed here. The colour-coding of the different codes is used throughout the article.

Note that only the competitions that appear on this page excluding those specifically not included are considered, there are many other (generally smaller) competitions, leagues and matches that take place for all of the football codes, but these are not included. The following are included:

 Rugby union attendances include some games from the Super Rugby.
 The rugby league figures include representative matches (State of Origin and International Tests Matches).
 Association football (soccer) attendances include A-League regular season and finals matches, and local attendances for international representative matches.

Attendances by League
Some codes have multiple competitions, several competitions are compared here.

Only matches and competitions specifically controlled and sanctioned by each league are counted; matches such as inter-club trial matches are not counted.

Attendances by Team
Total home attendances for domestic league competitions are listed here.

Teams are listed by competition – tournament and league competitions that are more than one game in length are taken into consideration.

Attendances by Match
Attendances for single matches are listed here. Note that not all matches are necessarily included.

Representative Competitions
These are matches that are part of a regular representative competition.

Single matches
These are one-off matches, that aren't part of any regular league competition.

Preseason

Finals

Regular season

See also
Australian rules football attendance records
2013 NRL season results
Sports attendance
List of sports venues in Australia

Notes

External links
 Official Website of the Australian Football League
 National Rugby League
 A-League Official website
 Asian Champions League Official website

Note: Sources for this Article are from Wikipedia related articles regarding the included competitions and teams.

2013 in Australian rugby league
2013 in Australian rugby union
2013 in Australian soccer
2013 in Australian rules football
2013